Chasing Yesterday is a 1935 American historical drama film directed by George Nicholls Jr. using a screenplay by Francis Edward Faragoh, adapted from the 1881 novel Le Crime de Sylvestre Bonnard, by Anatole France.  Released on May 3, 1935, the film stars Anne Shirley, O. P. Heggie, and Helen Westley.

A Parisian book collector realizes that the only clue to the whereabouts of a long-missing rare book is a love note from his own youth. He returns to his hometown in search of the book, but instead discovers that his former lover has been survived by a teenage daughter. He becomes emotionally attached to the girl, and plans to adopt her. But he has to face the crooked lawyer who serves as her current legal guardian.

Plot
Sylvestre Bonnard is an aging book collector. While going through his mementos one afternoon, he comes across a brief note written by a former lover. Studying it, he realizes that it is written on a page torn from a rare book that he has been seeking for decades. Excited, he decides to return to his home town, where he and the lover had their romance, to search for the book.

When Bonnard arrives, he meets an attorney, Mouche, through which he discovers that his old flame had a daughter, who now lives in a girl's boarding school. Mouche is the girl's guardian. Failing to find the book in his search, Bonnard travels to the school to speak with the daughter, Jeanne. On his arrival, he is dismayed to find that both Mouche and the school's headmistress, Mlle. Prefere, treat the young 15-year old cruelly. He is also entranced by the young lady, so much so that the focus of his trip now turns from a search for the book to an attempt to rescue the girl.

Sensing a way to escape the confines of the school, and unbeknownst to Bonnard, Jeanne convinces Mlle. Prefere that he is romantically interested in her. When Bonnard returns to his home in Paris, Jeanne tells Prefere that Bonnard would be thrilled if they paid him a visit there. When they arrive, Bonnard is thrilled, which Prefere misinterprets as a show of romantic interest. As time goes on and they remain in Paris, Prefere becomes more and more convinced that Bonnard is indeed in love with her. When she broaches the subject of marriage to the aging bibliophile he is aghast at the suggestion. In the ensuing confusion, Jeanne confesses her subterfuge, which causes Prefere to understandably react angrily. Embarrassed, Prefere ushers Jeanne back to the school, barring Bonnard from attempting to visit the young girl, to whom he becomes strongly attached.

Without permission, Bonnard travels to the school and, with Jeanne's wholehearted cooperation, whisks her away, with the intent of adopting her. Upon discovery of the girl's disappearance, Mouche realizes where she must have gone and goes to Paris to confront Bonnard. When he does, he offers to sell Jeanne's adoption to Bonnard, and for not pressing kidnapping charges, for a large sum of money. Wishing to get the girl out of her unfortunate circumstances, Bonnard agrees to the sale, but the only way he can raise the money is by selling his book collection. Distraught at the prospect of giving up his beloved books, but seeing no other way, sets up a time to complete the sale. However, Coccoz, a traveling bookseller with whom Bonnard is acquainted, shows up at the last minute and it is discovered that Mouche had stolen the rare book which had begun Bonnard's search in the first place. Not only has he stolen the book, but it is also found out that he had forged the original papers giving him custody of Jeanne.

With the tables turned, Mouche agrees to Bonnard's adoption of Jeanne, and forgoes any payment.

Cast
Anne Shirley as Jeanne Alexandre
O. P. Heggie as Sylvestre Bonnard
Helen Westley as Therese
Elizabeth Patterson as Mlle. Prefere
Etienne Girardot as Mouche
John Qualen as Aristide Coccoz
Trent Durkin as Henri
Doris Lloyd as Mme. De Gabry
Hilda Vaughn The Slavey

(cast list as per AFI database)

Production
In March 1935 it was revealed that the title of the film, based on France's book, would be Chasing Yesterday, and that Anne Shirley was slated as the star. By the end of March, photography on the film had been completed, and editing had begun.

Reception
Harrison's Reports gave the film a lukewarm review, complimenting the direction and acting, highlighting Heggie and Shirley, while thinking that the screenplay was lacking: "The story, however, unfolds in such a tame, listless, and uninteresting fashion that one soon becomes bored and loses interest in the outcome." The Film Daily was also less than kind, calling it a "Fair sentimental drama handled in simple style." The Educational Screen, however, gave the film a good review, calling the direction expert and the acting fine. Overall, they called the film charming and humorous, and a "delightful adaptation" of the France novel. Modern Screen felt the plot was thin and muddled, but felt that Heggie, Shirley, and Westley all gave good performances. Motion Picture Daily gave it a more positive review, complimenting Nicholls' direction, calling it charming and touching. They complimented the acting by Shirley, Girardot, and Qualen. They particularly doled out recognition for Patterson, calling her performance "outstanding", and saying about Heggie, "Few screen performances have equaled Heggie's portrayal." The Motion Picture Herald also enjoyed the picture, calling it sentimental and interesting, nicely juxtaposing comedy and drama, and they also felt that it was well directed.

References

External links
 
 

Films directed by George Nicholls Jr.
RKO Pictures films
Films produced by Cliff Reid
American historical drama films
1930s historical drama films
American black-and-white films
1935 drama films
1935 films
1930s American films
Films with screenplays by Francis Edward Faragoh
Films based on French novels
Films about bibliophilia
Films set in Paris
Films about kidnapping in France
1930s English-language films